Reed Seifer (born 1973) is an artist working in New York City.

Work

Reed Seifer created "optimism MetroCard,", a public art project produced in collaboration with MTA Arts and Design, and launched in 2009. The artwork involved a wordmark designed by the artist placed on the reverse of 14,000,000 Metrocards, New York City's public transportation pass.

In solo exhibitions at The Armory Show, 2010  and 2011, Reed Seifer presented projects "Spray to Forget" and "New York is a Lot of Work.," respectively.

"Spray to Forget," is an interactive, aromatherapeutic  work proposed to "edit one's consciousness" and remove "undesired memories" by spraying it. "New York is a Lot of Work." is an edition of 1,000 American one-dollar bills  imprinted in foil with the text, "New York is a lot of work." in black and white.

Reed Seifer's work has also been exhibited at Art Platform—Los Angeles, Los Angeles, CA; Hunt Gallery, Webster University, St. Louis; Clark University, Worcester, MA; ISCP and Proteus Gowanus in Brooklyn, NY; DC Moore Gallery, HERE Arts Center, and Printed Matter in New York, NY; Huize Frankendael, Amsterdam.

References

External links

Website specific to the optimism project
Reed Seifer Interview with Channel Thirteen/WNET.org

Artists from New York (state)
American contemporary artists
Living people
1973 births